Julio René Martínez Sicán (born 27 September 1973) is a Guatemalan race walker.

Personal bests
20 km: 1:17:46 hrs –  Eisenhüttenstadt, 8 May 1999
50 km: 3:56:19 hrs –  Naumburg, 1 May 2004

Achievements

References

1973 births
Living people
Guatemalan male racewalkers
Athletes (track and field) at the 1995 Pan American Games
Athletes (track and field) at the 1999 Pan American Games
Athletes (track and field) at the 2003 Pan American Games
Athletes (track and field) at the 2007 Pan American Games
Athletes (track and field) at the 1996 Summer Olympics
Athletes (track and field) at the 2000 Summer Olympics
Athletes (track and field) at the 2004 Summer Olympics
Olympic athletes of Guatemala
World record setters in athletics (track and field)
Pan American Games bronze medalists for Guatemala
Pan American Games medalists in athletics (track and field)
Central American and Caribbean Games bronze medalists for Guatemala
Central American Games gold medalists for Guatemala
Central American Games medalists in athletics
Central American Games silver medalists for Guatemala
Competitors at the 1993 Central American and Caribbean Games
Competitors at the 1998 Central American and Caribbean Games
Competitors at the 2002 Central American and Caribbean Games
Competitors at the 2006 Central American and Caribbean Games
Central American and Caribbean Games medalists in athletics
Medalists at the 1995 Pan American Games
20th-century Guatemalan people
21st-century Guatemalan people